Mugguru is a 2011 Telugu film directed by V. N. Aditya starring Navdeep, Shraddha Das and Reemma Sen in lead roles. Produced by D. Ramanaidu's Suresh Productions, the film also stars Avasarala Srinivas, Rahul Haridas, Sanjjanaa and Sowmya Bollapragada who gained fans and praise for her portrayal of Mohini in the film.

Cast
 Navdeep as Pawan
 Reemma Sen as Balatripura Sundari
 Shraddha Das as Shalini
 Avasarala Srinivas as Anji
 Rahul Haridas as Maruti
 Sanjjanaa Galrani as Yamini
 Sowmya Bollapragada as Mohini
 Ahuti Prasad as JP
 Brahmanandam as Chota Don
 Ali as Bade Miyaa
 Venu Madhav
 Dharmavarapu Subramanyam as Subba Rao
 Uttej as Job agent
 Thagubothu Ramesh as Chote Miyaa
 Sivaji in Cameo appearance.

Soundtrack

Reception

The film received a mixed response. Super Good Movies called it a desperate attempt to make an enjoyable comedy, and rated it 1.75 out of 5. Deepa Garimella of fullhyd.com rated it 6 out of 10, and said it deserves a chance although it doesn't match up with the sheer wit of an Allari Naresh comedy. Seasoned reviewers from The Hindu and rediff gave a thumbs up and a watchable verdict respectively.

References

External links
 
 https://archive.today/20130118011629/http://andhraheadlines.com/BrowseArticle.aspx?CatID=6&ArtId=87245

2011 films
2010s Telugu-language films
Films scored by Koti
Films directed by V. N. Aditya
Suresh Productions films